In differential geometry, an affine manifold is a differentiable manifold equipped with a flat, torsion-free connection.

This equivalence is an easy corollary of Cartan–Ambrose–Hicks theorem.

Equivalently, it is a manifold equipped with an atlas—called the affine structure—such that all transition functions between charts are affine transformations (that is, have constant Jacobian matrix); two atlases are equivalent if the manifold admits an atlas subjugated to both, with transitions from both atlases to a smaller atlas being affine. A manifold having a distinguished affine structure is called an affine manifold and the charts which are affinely related to those of the affine structure are called affine charts. In each affine coordinate domain the coordinate vector fields form a parallelisation of that domain, so there is an associated connection on each domain. These locally defined connections are the same on overlapping parts, so there is a unique connection associated with an affine structure. Note there is a link between linear connection (also called affine connection) and a web.

Formal definition
An affine manifold  is a real manifold with charts  such that  for all  where  denotes the Lie group of affine transformations.

A fundamental group of a compact complete flat affine manifold is called an affine crystallographic group. Classification of affine crystallographic groups is a difficult problem, far from being solved. The Riemannian crystallographic groups (also known as Bieberbach groups) were classified by Ludwig Bieberbach, answering a question posed by David Hilbert. In his work on Hilbert's 18-th problem, Bieberbach proved that any Riemannian crystallographic group contains an abelian subgroup of finite index.

Important longstanding conjectures
Geometry of affine manifolds is essentially a network of longstanding conjectures; most of them proven in low dimension and some other special cases.

The most important of them are:

Markus conjecture (1962) stating that a compact affine manifold is complete if and only if it has parallel volume. Known in dimension 2.
Auslander conjecture (1964) stating that any affine crystallographic group contains a polycyclic subgroup of finite index. Known in dimensions up to 6, and when the holonomy of the flat connection preserves a Lorentz metric. Since every virtually polycyclic crystallographic group preserves a volume form, Auslander conjecture implies the "only if" part of the Markus conjecture.
Chern conjecture (1955) The Euler class of an affine manifold vanishes.

Notes

References
 

 

Group theory
Affine geometry
Structures on manifolds
Differential geometry
Manifolds